Moelwyn Mawr North Ridge Top is a top of Moelwyn Mawr in Snowdonia, North Wales and forms part of the Moelwynion. From its summit, which directly overlooks Bwlch Rhosydd, can be seen Cnicht, Allt-fawr and Moel-yr-hydd. A recently discovered 'top' has only received attention from Nuttall baggers.

References

External links
 www.geograph.co.uk : photos of Moelwyn Mawr and surrounding area

Ffestiniog
Llanfrothen
Mountains and hills of Gwynedd
Mountains and hills of Snowdonia
Nuttalls

cy:Moelwyn Mawr